Paul Groesse (28 February 1906 – 4 May 1987) was a Hungarian-born American art director. He won three Academy Awards and was nominated for another eight in the category Best Art Direction.

Academy Awards
Groesse won three Academy Awards for Best Art Direction and was nominated a further eight times in the same category:
Won
 Pride and Prejudice (1940)
 The Yearling (1946)
 Little Women (1949)
Nominated
 Madame Curie (1943)
 Annie Get Your Gun (1950)
 Too Young to Kiss (1951)
 The Merry Widow (1952)
 Lili (1953)
 The Music Man (1962)
 Twilight of Honor (1963)
 Mister Buddwing (1966)

References

External links

1906 births
1987 deaths
American art directors
Best Art Direction Academy Award winners
People from Los Angeles
Hungarian emigrants to the United States